The Chesapeake and Ohio Railway's K-4 class were a group of ninety 2-8-4 steam locomotives purchased during and shortly after World War II. Unlike many other railroads in the United States, the C&O chose to nickname this class "Kanawha", after the river in West Virginia, rather than "Berkshire", after the region in New England.

Several examples survive today, including at the National Railroad Museum, Science Museum of Virginia, Chief Logan State Park, and B&O Railroad Museum.

Details 
During the 1940s, the C&O K-4's were being built to haul heavy freight services and were used mostly for high speed freight and passenger services throughout the north-eastern regions of the United States and part of Ontario, Canada by the Pere Marquette Railway. C&O Class K-4s were one of the few recognizable 2-8-4 (Berkshires) classes in North America along with the Pere Marquette Class N (road numbers 1201-1239), and Nickel Plate Road Class S (road numbers 715-779). Both the PM Class N and NKP Class S were manufactured by the Lima Locomotive Works in Lima, Ohio. NKP 779 was the last standard-gauge Berkshire to be built in the world, and the last steam locomotive built by Lima Locomotive Works. They were successful locomotives and were popular with crews, so popular with them that they referred to the locomotives as "Big Mikes".

The Chesapeake and Ohio Class K-4 Kanawhas aren't the only 2-8-4 Berkshires of their size. Pere Marquette Nos. 1223 and 1225, and Nickel Plate Road Nos. 755, 757, 759, 763, 765, and 779 are other preserved examples of these workhorses.

One Kanawha (No. 2701) was on display in Buffalo, New York after retirement, but was vandalized beyond repair and was eventually scrapped a few months after being on display.

Preserved Locomotives
Twelve Kanawhas have been preserved, with No. 2716 being restored to operation.
2700 (On Display) Dennison Railroad Depot Museum - Dennison, Ohio. The first Kanawha built, cosmetically restored in 2017.
2705 (On Display) Baltimore & Ohio Railroad Museum - Baltimore, Maryland.
2707 (On Display) Illinois Railway Museum - Union, Illinois.
2716 (Undergoing Restoration to Operating Condition) Kentucky Steam Heritage Center - Ravenna, Kentucky.
2727 (On Display) National Museum of Transportation - St. Louis, Missouri.
2732 (On Display) Science Museum of Virginia - Richmond, Virginia.
2736 (On Display) National Railroad Museum - Green Bay, Wisconsin.
2755 (On Display) Chief Logan State Park - Logan, West Virginia.
2756 (On Display) Huntington Park - Newport News, Virginia.
2760 (On Display) Riverfront Park - Lynchburg, Virginia.
2776 (On Display) Eyman Park Dr - Washington Court House, Ohio.
2789 (On Display) Hoosier Valley Railroad Museum - North Judson, Indiana. The last Kanawha built.

See also
Chesapeake and Ohio class T-1
Chesapeake and Ohio class H-8

References

Further reading

2-8-4 locomotives
K-4
ALCO locomotives
Railway locomotives introduced in 1943
Steam locomotives of the United States
Freight locomotives
Standard gauge locomotives of the United States